Mark Linett is an American record producer and audio engineer who is best known for his remixing and remastering of the Beach Boys' catalog. Since 1988, he has been the engineer for Brian Wilson's recordings. He has also worked with Red Hot Chili Peppers, Jane's Addiction, Los Lobos, Rickie Lee Jones and Randy Newman. Linett is based in Glendale, California, where he owns a home studio, Your Place or Mine Recording.

Linett created the first true stereo mix of the Beach Boys' 1966 album Pet Sounds and has co-produced many of the band's archival release, including The Pet Sounds Sessions (1997), Endless Harmony Soundtrack (1998), Hawthorne, CA (2003), and The Smile Sessions (2011). In addition to winning two Grammy Awards, he was nominated for Best Engineered Album for his work on Brian Wilson Presents Smile (2004). In 2014, Linett made a cameo appearance as Chuck Britz in the Brian Wilson biopic Love & Mercy.

To create remixes of the Beach Boys' catalog, Linett uses ProTools as his DAW of choice, although he keeps analog tape machines for the purpose of transferring to digital. Since 2000, producer Alan Boyd, the band's archive manager, has been his longtime partner for such projects.

References

External links
 
 

American record producers
American audio engineers
Living people
Grammy Award winners
Place of birth missing (living people)
Year of birth missing (living people)